TV Syd is one of TV 2's eight regional services. It is headquartered in Kolding although it was previously based in Haderslev.

TV Syd was launched in 1983 as an experimental regional channel operated by Danmarks Radio (DR). Upon the launch of TV 2 in 1988 it was immediately co-opted into the TV 2 network as its first regional service.

External links 
TV Syd official website

Television stations in Denmark
Television channels and stations established in 1983
Mass media in Kolding
Mass media in Haderslev